Zexmenia is a genus of Latin American plants in the tribe Heliantheae within the family Asteraceae.

 Species

 Formerly included
numerous species now considered more suited to other genera: Angelphytum Calyptocarpus Dimerostemma Jefea Lasianthaea Lundellianthus Oblivia Otopappus Oyedaea Sanvitalia Tuxtla Verbesina Wamalchitamia Wedelia

References

External links

Heliantheae
Asteraceae genera